Deondre Kendrell Parks Jr. (born October 30, 1992) is an American professional basketball player for Sigal Prishtina of the Kosovo Basketball League. He played college basketball at Iowa Lakes Community College and at South Dakota State before playing professionally in the United Kingdom, Georgia, Cyprus, Tunisia, Canada and Israel.

High school career
Parks played high school in his hometown of Flint, MI at Flint Northwestern High School. Parks finished his prep career at Kingdom Christian Academy in Columbus, Georgia

College career

Iowa Lakes Community College
Parks began his career at Iowa Lakes Community College, where he averaged 15.3 points, 5.4 rebounds and 2.5 assists per game as a freshman. As a sophomore, he averaged 20.4 points, 5.2 rebounds and 2.7 assists per game, leading the team to a 23-9 overall record, earning ICCAC Division II All-Region First Team honors along the way.

South Dakota State
Parks transferred to South Dakota State for last two seasons. He averaged 14.4 points and 4.3 rebounds per game for the Jackrabbits and was named first-team All-Summit League and Atlantic Sun Freshman of the Year in 2015.

Professional career

Newcastle Eagles (2016–2017)
On August 2, 2016, Parks signed with Newcastle Eagles of the British Basketball League (BBL).

Cactus Tbilisi (2017–2018)
On September 5, 2018, Parks signed with Cactus Tbilisi of the Georgian Superliga. He averaged 20.8 points, 3.5 rebounds, 3.1 assists per game.

Proteas EKA (2018–2019)
On September 13, 2018, Parks signed with Proteas EKA AEL . He averaged 18.7 points per game, being the top scorer of the league.

Hapoel Hevel Modi'in (2019–2020)
On September 2, 2019, Parks signed with Hapoel Hevel Modi'in for the 2019–20 season. He averaged 22.1 points, 4.9 rebounds and 3.3 assists per game.

Vilpas Vikings (2020–2021)
On September 25, 2020, Parks signed with Konyaspor of the Turkish Basketball First League. However, he instead joined the Vilpas Vikings of the Korisliiga.

ZTE KK (2021–2022)
In 2021, Parks signed with ZTE KK of the Hungarian Nemzeti Bajnokság I/A. He averaged 13.0 points, 2.4 rebounds, and 1.5 assists per game.

Sigal Prishtina (2023–present)
On January 12, 2023, Parks signed with Sigal Prishtina of the Kosovo Basketball League.

References

External links
South Dakota State bio
RealGM profile

1992 births
Living people
AEL Limassol B.C. players
American expatriate basketball people in Canada
American expatriate basketball people in Cyprus
American expatriate basketball people in Finland
American expatriate basketball people in Georgia (country)
American expatriate basketball people in Hungary
American expatriate basketball people in Israel
American expatriate basketball people in the United Kingdom
American men's basketball players
Basketball players from Flint, Michigan
Hapoel Hevel Modi'in B.C. players
Newcastle Eagles players
Point guards
South Dakota State Jackrabbits men's basketball players
Iowa Lakes Lakers men's basketball players